Daikoku Seamount is an active volcanic seamount in the Northern Mariana Islands of the United States. This underwater volcano is located at the northern end of the Mariana Islands range.

Geography
It is located within the sub-region of Micronesia in the Pacific Ocean, which consists of hundreds of islands.

Structure
Daikoku is a volcanic cone sitting on top of an older caldera, which has been almost completely filled during periods of volcanic activity. At several sites near the summit molten sulfur has been observed, forming both rivulets and ponds. One such pond has been stopped from crusting over by bubbling gases. It has been called the "Sulfur Cauldron" and compared to the sulfur volcanism on Io, a moon of Jupiter.

Composition
The volcano is known to be of andesitic origin, with high-temperature hydrothermal vents that release high concentrations of gas.

Geologic setting

The seamount is located in the Mariana Island Arc, which is a volcanic island arc formed from magma generation in the process of subduction, in which a tectonic plate subsides under another plate. In this case, the Pacific Plate subducts beneath the Mariana Plate through the Mariana Trench, which is the deepest trench in the world. The typical type of volcanoes formed by this subduction are stratovolcanoes. Their structures consist of layers of volcanic ash, pumice, and other volcanic rocks.

Fauna

The volcano has many hydrothermal vents, which can host various animal species including the one which makes this seamount widely known, the tonguefish Symphurus thermophilus. 

These fish are very common and aggregate especially in flat areas with loose sediments. They are bottom-dwelling flatfish, which move frequently in small steps. Large groups of tonguefish occur up to the edge of the sulfur pond, and some fish were observed to swim onto, and pause on, the congealing sulfur, apparently unharmed. Their diet consists mostly of smaller crustaceans and polychaetes. 

Also common on the sediment slopes of the seamount are the gastropod Oenopota ogasawarana and hermit crabs. On the sulphur layers at the base of the slope are bythograeid crabs, but no shrimps were found on this seamount.

Like the tonguefish, the tubeworms also are mostly found near hydrothermal vents.

Activity

Volcanic activity on Daikoku has been continuing for the last two decades, since the discovery of the sulfur pond in the summit crater. Several expeditions have been carried out by the National Oceanic and Atmospheric Administration (NOAA) over the last few years, and activity was persistent whenever an expedition was there to observe it. In 2014, an eruption was apparently occurring according to high hydrogen concentrations in water samples from above the summit.

2006 expedition
The "Submarine Ring of Fire 2006" expedition took place between April 18 and May 13, 2006, and targeted the exploration of the Mariana Islands volcanoes. On May 4, 2006, the research vessel arrived at Daikoku and deployed the remotely operated underwater vehicle (ROV) Jason. This lead to the discovery of the sulfur pond at the summit.

2016 expedition
In June 2016, the Okeanos Explorer research vessel was involved in an expedition in the region of the Mariana Islands, and its remote operated vehicle (ROV) made a dive at the Daikoku seamount. Two days before the dive to Daikoku, the Okeanos's sonars detected a strong plume which could have been a hydrothermal bubble plume near the peak of Daikoku. This led to the change of some equipment on the Daikoku dive from the dive on Eifuku.

ROV Deep Discoverer landed on the flanks of the Daikoku Seamount. During the 10-hour dive, the visibility was low due to the smoke from the sulfur vents. Despite that, the ROV was still able to operate. The slopes were reported to be covered with volcaniclastics and volcanic ash. Fumaroles were also found, which is usual for active volcanoes.

Other than volcanic activity, the animals that live on the seamount were also observed. For the first time, sea anemones were seen growing on the tips of tubeworms in the area.

See also
Nikkō Seamount
Eifuku
Izu-Bonin-Mariana Arc

References

Sources

 
 
 
 

Volcanoes of the United States
Seamounts of the Pacific Ocean
Submarine volcanoes
Articles containing video clips